Coleophora dentiferoides is a moth of the family Coleophoridae. It is found in Canada, including Nova Scotia.

The larvae feed on the seeds of Juncus militaris. They create a tubular silken seed case.

References

dentiferoides
Moths described in 1958
Moths of North America